Alexander Strelinger (10 September 1934 in Martin – 10 July 2022 in Prague) was a Slovak cinematographer and photographer. After graduating from the Film and TV School of the Academy of Performing Arts in Prague in 1960, he became a cinematographer for documentary films in Bratislava, working most notably on the films Človek a hra (1969), Ľudovít Fulla (1972), Terchovská muzika (1984), and Pavol Socháň (1987) with Martin Slivka, the films Nemecká (1974) and Len lístok poľnej pošty (1977) with Peter Solan, the films Analógie (1965), Impresia (1966), and Variácie kľudu (1966) with Dušan Hanák, and the films Slovenský raj (1966), Črty z Indie (1967), Hr. Peklo (1967), and Mimoriadne cvičenie (1971) with Vladimir Kubenko. He was awarded a lifetime achievement award at the Kamera Awards in 2008. He also taught documentary filmmaking at the Academy of Performing Arts in Bratislava for several years before his death in 2022.

References 

1934 births
2022 deaths
Slovak cinematographers
Slovak photographers
Slovak documentary filmmakers
Documentary film directors
People from Martin, Slovakia